Zieliński (feminine Zielińska, plural Zielińscy) is the eighth most common surname in Poland (91,522 people in 2009), and is also common in other countries in various forms. The first Polish records of the surname date to the 15th century. Without diacritical marks, it is spelled Zielinski. The Russianized form is Zelinski.

Origin

Polish surnames ending in "-ski" are of toponymic origin, meaning they identify someone as an inhabitant of a given community, and not through association with what the name's root meant. Thus, given the great number of similarly named localities, linguistically Zielin, Zielinca, Zieliniec and Zielińsk would be the most perfect matches. Some others might include Zieleniec, Zielinice, Zieleniew, Zieleniewo, Zieleń, Zielęcice, Zielięcin, Zielniczki, Zielniki and Zielona.

Polish: a toponymic surname, with the toponym stemming from the word zieleń, meaning the color green, or referring to vibrancy and youth. It also could have originated from the word 'zioło', meaning plant or herb.
Jewish (Ashkenazic, from Poland): a habitational name for someone from places in Poland called Zielona or Zielonka, deriving from the root word meaning green.
German: the name is also particularly well-established in Germany due to migration patterns over centuries. The Germanized version of this surname is Zelinsky or Saleznicky, usually found in the Silesia region.

Clans and Polish coats of arms
Due to the sheer size and frequency distribution of the name, it is difficult to trace common origins or use of armigerous coats of arms (herby) in the Polish clan system.

People
 Adrian Zieliński (born 1989), Polish weightlifter
 Andrzej Zieliński (disambiguation), multiple individuals
 Anna Zielińska-Głębocka (born 1949), Polish politician
 Chad Zielinski (born 1964), American Catholic bishop
 Damian Zieliński (born 1981), Polish cyclist
 Edmund Zieliński (1909–1992), Polish ice hockey player
 Ewa Zielińska (born 1972), Polish Paralympic athlete
 Henryk Zieliński (1920-1981), Polish historian
 Izabella Zielińska (1910–2017), Polish pianist and pedagogue
 Jacek Zieliński (disambiguation), multiple individuals
 Jan Zieliński (born 1996), Polish tennis player
 Jarosław Zieliński (born 1960), Polish politician
 Jerzy Zieliński (disambiguation), multiple individuals
 Lidia Zielińska (born 1953), Polish composer
 Maciej Zielinski (born 1971), Polish composer
 Marian Zieliński (1929–2005), Polish weightlifter
 Paul Zielinski (1911–1966), German footballer
 Paweł Zieliński, Polish footballer
 Piotr Zieliński (born 1994), Polish footballer
 Rajmund Zieliński (1940-2022), Polish cyclist
 Ricardo Zielinski (born 1959), Argentine football player and manager
 Tadeusz Zieliński (disambiguation), multiple individuals
 Thaddeus Zielinski (1916–1990), American bishop
 Tony Zielinski (born 1961), American politician
 Tomasz Zieliński (born 1990), Polish weightlifter
 Władysław Zieliński (born 1935), Polish sprint canoer
 Wiktor Zieliński (born 2001), Polish pool player
 Zygmunt Zieliński (1858–1925), Polish general

See also

References

Polish-language surnames
Polish toponymic surnames

ru:Зелинский